The 2019 Thai League 4 Southern region is a region in the regional stage of the 2019 Thai League 4. A total of 7 teams located in Southern of Thailand will compete in the league of the Southern region.

Teams

Number of teams by province

Stadiums and locations

League table

Standings

Positions by round

Results by round

Results
For the Southern region, a total 24 matches per team competing in 4 legs.

Season statistics

Top scorers by team

Attendances

Overall statistical table

Attendances by home match played

Source: Thai League
Note: Some error of T4 official match report 17 March 2019 (Satun United 1–1 Phatthalung).
 Some error of T4 official match report 21 April 2019 (Hatyai City 0–1 Satun United).

See also
 2019 Thai League 1
 2019 Thai League 2
 2019 Thai League 3
 2019 Thai League 4
 2019 Thailand Amateur League
 2019 Thai FA Cup
 2019 Thai League Cup
 2019 Thailand Champions Cup

References

External links
 Official website of Thai League

4